The Ashmont–Mattapan High-Speed Line, commonly referred to as the Mattapan Trolley, is a partially grade-separated light rail line which forms part of the MBTA's Red Line rapid transit line. The line, which runs through Boston and Milton, Massachusetts, opened on August 26, 1929, as a conversion of a former commuter rail line.  It exclusively uses PCC streetcars, supported by a maintenance team of blacksmiths and metalworkers who make parts for the historic rolling stock. Passengers must transfer at Ashmont to access the rest of the Red Line, which uses heavy rail metro rolling stock.

The trolley's  route is used only by streetcars and has just two public grade crossings. All stations have low platforms, but all except Valley Road have been retrofitted with wheelchair lifts or wooden ramps for accessibility. Unlike most heritage streetcar lines, it is an integral part of the modern MBTA transit system rather than a tourist attraction.

History

Commuter rail lines

The Dorchester and Milton Branch Railroad opened in December 1847 from Neponset on the Old Colony Railroad main line to Mattapan station in Dorchester via Milton Mills (later Milton Lower Mills, then simply Milton). The line was immediately leased by the Old Colony as its Milton branch. The Old Colony built the Shawmut Branch Railroad from Harrison Square on the main line to Milton Lower Mills via Peabody Square in 1872. Most Mattapan passenger service switched to use the new branch east of Milton, as it ran through dense urban neighborhoods rather than swamps. The Old Colony Railroad and its branches were acquired by the New York, New Haven and Hartford Railroad in 1893.

When the Boston Elevated Railway (BERy) was first constructing its rapid transit Cambridge–Dorchester line in the early 1910s, plans called for the line to be extended south from Andrew to Codman Square via Edward Everett Square, Columbia Square, and Mount Bowdoin. The route would have paralleled the New Haven's Shawmut branch and Midland Division. Around 1920, BERy reached an agreement with the New Haven and the Boston Transit Commission to pursue the Dorchester Circuit Plan. Under that plan, a bidirectional rapid transit loop would run south from Andrew along the Old Colony main line, take over the Shawmut Branch and Milton branch to Mattapan, cut over to the Midland Division on a tunnel, and return to Andrew via the Midland Division right-of-way and another tunnel segment.

Rapid transit conversion

Although the Midland Branch served more populated areas, real estate deals along the Shawmut branch stood to benefit key state politicians. Construction of a rapid transit extension to Mattapan via the Shawmut branch was approved on March 23, 1923.

Steam trains were discontinued in 1927 and the line was closed for two years while it was modified for streetcars. There was a debate at that time whether or not to continue subway trains from Boston to Ashmont onwards to Mattapan, but the cost of full-scale subway service was apparently too high for the Boston Elevated Railway which then operated it. The line opened from Ashmont to Milton on August 26, 1929, and from Milton to Mattapan on December 21, 1929.

A new stop was opened at Capen Street in September 1930, and the Butler stop opened on October 7, 1931. In 1966, the Red Line designation was also applied to this line, which had been known as 28 Mattapan–Ashmont. On March 18, 1968, the Neponset River flooded the line at Milton station. Restoration work began at 6:00 am on March 21 as the waters receded; service was resumed by 4:30 pm.

In January 1981, the MBTA proposed to close the Mattapan Line at all times beginning that March due to severe budget issues. The closure was cancelled, though the Mattapan line and the Ashmont branch were closed from June 20, 1981, to January 16, 1982, for track replacement and tunnel repairs.

The line's longest shutdown started June 24, 2006, while the Ashmont and Mattapan stations were renovated and service was replaced by shuttle buses. Service was restored on December 22, 2007. Several of the stations have been renovated for better accessibility and modernization; all stations are now wheelchair-accessible except Valley Road, which is down a grade from the nearest road with no room for a ramp.

Stations on the line had red signage up until the line's closure for renovation. When the line reopened in 2007, green signage was used at stations to indicate the line's light rail character, contrary to the MBTA's practice of color-coding signage to match the line. However, in 2008 the green signage was replaced with red signage to match the line's color.

The MBTA launched the Mattapan Line Transformation project in 2019, though it was largely inactive until 2022. The project aims to replace the PCC trolleys with light rail vehicles as the Green Line fleet turns over, restore the line's ability to operate during snowstorms, rebuild all eight stations, replace track and signals, and repair bridges. Rehabilitation of the existing fleet is happening at the same time, to extend trolley life a few more years until LRVs arrive.

Route

The line begins and ends within the city of Boston, but most of the southern half of its route is in the northern part of the neighboring town of Milton. It follows the right-of-way of two former Old Colony Railroad branches which had commuter rail service until the 1920s. Much of the route parallels the Neponset River, crossing it twice. The right-of-way is owned by the MBTA and has only two at-grade crossings on its  route. Between Cedar Grove and Butler stations, the line runs through the center of the Cedar Grove Cemetery.

Station listing

Accidents

On March 20, 1979, three trolleys collided between Central Avenue and Valley Road stations. The first two trolleys had stopped to avoid a police car, which had become stuck on the tracks while the officer was investigating teenagers drinking near the line. A third trolley was unable to stop in time while approaching around a blind curve; it slammed into the first two trolleys, causing injuries, but no deaths.

Using funding from the American Recovery and Reinvestment Act of 2009, the MBTA conducted a pilot test of technology similar to a collision avoidance system in an automobile, using radar and increasingly fast beeping to warn train operators of obstacles ahead. Like positive train control, it would stop the train if the driver did not take action to avoid an impending collision. If successful, the system would be considered for deployment on the Green Line, where multiple collisions had occurred in recent years.

On November 26, 2014, an out-of-service streetcar collided with an in-service streetcar near Cedar Grove. Seven people were injured.

On December 29, 2017, a collision between two in-service streetcars caused 17 injuries. The accident, caused by operator error, reduced the line to five operable streetcars.

Rolling stock

The rolling stock consists of rebuilt PCC streetcars, which were formerly part of a fleet shared with the Green Line. The historic rolling stock is retained largely because the line, built for 1920s streetcars, would have to be substantially rebuilt to accommodate the heavier modern cars used on the Green Line. In order to clear the line of snow, the MBTA maintains a jet engine-powered snowblower, officially the Portec RMC Hurricane Jet Snow Blower, model RP-3, dubbed "Snowzilla". Snowzilla weighs , measures 8 by 12 by 27 feet, and is powered by a Westinghouse J34 turbojet engine. Other T lines simply run regular trains to clear the tracks of snow, but the PCC cars' traction motors would short out if they were used for that purpose.

The current set of PCC cars are "Wartime" PCCs, built by Pullman-Standard in 1945–46. They have been in continuous revenue service in Boston since their construction, although PCC cars were not assigned to the Mattapan Line until 1955. The current fleet was rebuilt as part of a systemwide PCC rebuild program in 1978–83, and again in 1999-2005. During the latter rebuild, the cars were repainted from their former Green Line paint scheme to a brighter orange and cream design, similar to their original coloring. The cars also carry a unique geographic MBTA logo, reminiscent of the old Metropolitan Transit Authority map logo found on the cars between 1948 and 1955.

On several occasions, the MBTA has proposed to replace the PCC streetcars either with newer trolleys or with buses, and has met with substantial community opposition on each occasion. The FY2017-FY2021 Capital Investment Plan, approved by the MassDOT board in June 2016, allocated $9 million to the line including $3.7 million for maintaining the PCC cars. The plan also allocates $5 million for "PCC Car Replacement-Alternative Service" which will be used for future funding should an alternate form of transportation be decided upon. In 2017, MBTA began a $7.9 million project to overhaul the trolleys and update the propulsion systems, but further problems such as fluctuations in power damaged the four operating trains in early 2018. On February 5, 2018, it was reported that eight more trolleys were going to re-enter service in 2019, the fixes will prolong the lifespan of the trains by another 7 to 8 years. After several delays, the first rebuilt trolley entered service in March 2022.

The MBTA also announced in 2018 that it was studying alternatives again to running trolleys. Alternatives that were being considered were further repairs of the existing PCC cars, procurement of new replicas of historic cars, and turning the line into a busway. Local politicians and citizens who live along the line have voiced their concerns over the potential conversion of the line into a busway and prefer that the route be maintained as using rail technology. , eventual conversion for use of new light rail vehicles (or Type 9 LRVs transferred from the Green Line) was reported to be the most viable option.

Fleet
The Ashmont–Mattapan High-Speed Line fleet of PCC streetcars consist of 10 units, of which 6 are in service (1 refurbished).

References

External links

MBTA - Mattapan Trolley

1929 establishments in Massachusetts
Streetcars in the Boston area
Old Colony Railroad lines
Red Line (MBTA)
Light rail in Massachusetts
Standard gauge railways in the United States
600 V DC railway electrification